The men's 1 metre springboard is part of the Diving at the 2022 Commonwealth Games program. The competition will be held on 4 August 2022 at Sandwell Aquatics Centre in Birmingham.

Format
The competition will be held in two rounds:
 Preliminary round: All divers perform six dives; the top 12 divers advance to the final. If there are12 or fewer entrants, all entrants progress with final order decided by preliminaries score.
 Final: Divers perform six dives; the preliminary round scores are erased and the top three divers win the gold, silver and bronze medals accordingly.

Schedule
All times are British Summmer Time (UTC+1).

Results
The preliminary field was announced on 20 July 2022; it remains subject to change: With 11 entrants, all divers qualified for the final, with preliminary scores used to set start order in the final.

Jack Laugher of England won his third successive Commonwealth Games gold medal in 1 metre springboard, equalling the record of Canadian Alexandre Despatie.

Green denotes finalists

References

Diving at the 2022 Commonwealth Games